The 2016–17 FC Ingolstadt 04 season is the 13th season in the football club's history and 2nd consecutive and overall season in the top flight of German football, the Bundesliga, having been promoted from the 2. Bundesliga in 2015. FC Ingolstadt will also participate in this season's edition of the domestic cup, the DFB-Pokal. It is the 7th overall season for FC Ingolstadt in the Audi Sportpark, located in Ingolstadt, Germany. The season covers a period from 1 July 2016 to 30 June 2017.

Background
On 6 May 2016, Markus Kauczinski was confirmed to replace Ralph Hasenhüttl as head coach for the season.

Players

Squad

 (Captain)

Transfers

In

Out

Friendly matches

Competitions

Overview

Bundesliga

League table

Results summary

Results by round

Matches

DFB-Pokal

Statistics

Appearances and goals

|-
! colspan=14 style=background:#dcdcdc; text-align:center| Goalkeepers

|-
! colspan=14 style=background:#dcdcdc; text-align:center| Defenders

|-
! colspan=14 style=background:#dcdcdc; text-align:center| Midfielders

|-
! colspan=14 style=background:#dcdcdc; text-align:center| Forwards

|-
! colspan=14 style=background:#dcdcdc; text-align:center| Players transferred out during the season

Goalscorers

Last updated: 20 May 2017

Clean sheets

* Includes one shared clean sheet against RB Leipzig.
Last updated: 29 April 2017

Disciplinary record

Last updated: 20 May 2017

References

Ingolstadt 04, FC
FC Ingolstadt 04 seasons